Daizen Takahiro  (born 14 December 1964 as Tokuo Takahashi) is a former sumo wrestler from Osaka, Osaka, Japan. He made his professional debut in March 1981, and reached the top division in November 1991. His highest rank was komusubi and he earned two kinboshi. After his retirement in 2003 he became an elder in the Japan Sumo Association and a coach at Nishonoseki stable. Upon the closure of his stable in 2013 he moved to Kasugano stable.

Career record

See also
Glossary of sumo terms
List of past sumo wrestlers
List of sumo elders
List of sumo tournament second division champions
List of komusubi

References

External links

1964 births
Living people
Japanese sumo wrestlers
People from Osaka
Sumo people from Osaka Prefecture
Komusubi